The Bengaliinae are a subfamily of Calliphoridae, or blow flies.

Genera
Auchmeromyia Brauer & Bergenstamm, 1891
Bengalia Robineau-Desvoidy, 1830
Booponus Aldrich, 1923
Coganomyia Dear, 1977
Cordylobia Grünberg, 1903
Hemigymnochaeta Corti, 1895
Mafikengia Rognes, 2011
Pachychoeromyia Villeneuve, 1920
Termitocalliphora Bauristhene in Pont, 1980
Termitoloemus Baranov, 1936
Tricyclea Wulp, 1885
Tricycleala Villeneuve, 1937
Verticia Malloch, 1927

References

Calliphoridae
Diptera subfamilies